Siyah Beyaz Aşk (English title: Price of Passion) is a Turkish romantic drama television series starring İbrahim Çelikkol, Birce Akalay, Muhammet Uzuner, Arzu Gamze Kılınç, Ece Dizdar and Deniz Celiloğlu. It premiered on Kanal D on October 16, 2017 and concluded on May 28, 2018.

Synopsis 
When doctor Aslı decides to help out someone and sees something she shouldn’t have seen, she learns two things. One, she accidentally helped a mafia leader. Two, he wants to kill her. That drastically changes as Ferhat, the mafia leader finds out Aslı has a brother in the police department. Not wanting to make the situation worse Ferhat gives the doctor an ultimatum:
Marry him and take his last name. 
Or die.

Cast 
İbrahim Çelikkol as Ferhat Aslan, Yeter and Namik's son, Asli's lover/husband.
Birce Akalay as Aslı Çınar Aslan, Cem’s younger sister, Ferhat's lover/wife.
Muhammet Uzuner as Namık Emirhan, Ferhat's father’s friend (who raised Ferhat and brought in the Aslans to his home) and Handan’s brother
 Arzu Gamze Kılınç as Yeter Aslan, Ferhat, Yiğit, and Gülsüm’s mother
Ece Dizdar as İdil Yaman Emirhan, Namik’s wife
Deniz Celiloğlu as Yiğit Aslan, Yeter’s son, Ferhat’s and Gülsüm’s brother, Suna’s husband and Özgür’s father 
 Cahit Gök as Cüneyt Koçak, Vildan’s husband, Gülsüm’s former lover and Necdet’s father
 Uğur Aslan as Cem Çınar, Asli’s older brother, Ebru's lover
Sinem Ünsal as Gülsüm Aslan Adaklı, Yeter’s daughter, Ferhat and Yiğit‘s younger sister, Abidin’s wife and Necdet’s mother
 Özlem Zeynep Dinsel as Vildan Koçak, Cüneyt’s wife, Ferhat’s former lover, Handan’s daughter and Özge’s mother
 Timur Ölkebaş as Abidin Adaklı, Ferhat’s cousin, Gülsüm’s husband, Handan’s son and Necdet’s adoptive father
 Burcu Tuna as Suna Aslan, Yiğit‘s wife and Özgür’s mother 
 Kadriye Kenter as Handan Adaklı, Namik’s sister, Vildan and Abidin’s mother 
 Fatih Topçuoğlu as Dilsiz, Ferhat’s right hand man and Hülya’s lover
 Ceylan Odman as Deniz, Asli's close friend.
 Nihan Aşıcı as Yaprak
 Burcu Cavrar as Hülya, maid of the Aslans and Dilsiz’s lover
 Selin Köseoğlu as Jülide, Asli and Cem’s long lost niece 
 Özgül Sağdıç as Ebru, Asli’s best friend-turned enemy, Cem's lover
 Batuhan Davutoglu as Özgür Aslan, Yiğit and Suna’s son.
 Roza Çelik as Özge Koçak, Vildan and Cüneyt’s daughter, Handan's granddaughter.

International broadcasting 
  - The series premiered on May 30, 2022, on VTV3 as Đam mê và trả giá.

References

External links 
  
 

2017 Turkish television series debuts
2018 Turkish television series endings
Turkish drama television series
Turkish romance television series
Kanal D original programming
Television series by D Productions
Turkish-language television shows
Television shows set in Istanbul